Roaring Wheels is a 2000 Hong Kong action movie directed by Aman Chang. The film stars Karen Mok, Dave Wong, Moses Chan and Maggie Siu in the lead roles.

Cast
 Karen Mok
 Dave Wong
 Moses Chan
 Maggie Siu
 An-ting Yeh

References

External links
 

2000 films
2000 action films
Hong Kong action films
2000s Cantonese-language films
2000s Hong Kong films